K. S. Ardhanareeswara Gounder was an Indian politician and former Member of the Legislative Assembly of Tamil Nadu. He was elected to the Tamil Nadu legislative assembly as an Indian National Congress candidate from Edapadi constituency in 1952 election, from Mettur constituency in 1957, and 1962 elections.

References 

Indian National Congress politicians from Tamil Nadu
Living people
Year of birth missing (living people)
Madras MLAs 1952–1957
Madras MLAs 1957–1962
Madras MLAs 1962–1967